Eugène Héros (14 August 1860 – 11 December 1925) was a French playwright and chansonnier.

Biography 
A lawyer and member of Le Chat noir, he collaborated among others to Le Figaro and to La France and became managing director of the Théâtre du Palais Royal (1907-1910) then of the Scala (1914-1918). His plays were presented on the most important Parisian stages of the 19th and begin of the 20th century including the Théâtre des Variétés, the Théâtre de Cluny, the Palais Royal, the Théâtre de la Renaissance, the Bataclan, and Bobino.

A founder of the magazine Le Gueux (1891-1892), several of his songs were published in La Rampe and Gil-Blas illustrated, from 1892 to 1900. They were performed among others by Jean Sablon or Jeannette Levasseur.

Works 
Theatre

 La Noce à Génie, 1885
 Il a des bottes !, revue in 3 tableaux, with Georges Bertal, 1888
 En livrée, vaudeville in 1 act, with Achille Mélandri, 1889
 Le Roi Claquette, operetta in 1 act, music by Félix Chaudoir, 1890
 Les Étrennes de M. Trouillard, folie-opérette in 1 act, music by Gangloff, 1891
 Le Fils de Madame Blum, monologue, 1891
 La Partie de baccara, comédie-vaudeville in 1 act, 1891
 L'Héritier, opérette-bouffe in 1 act, music by Gangloff, 1892
 Leur bonheur !, comédie-vaudeville in 1 act, with Georges Mathieu, 1895
 La Tziganie dans les ménages, play in 1 act and 2 tableaux, with Adolphe Jost, 1897
 Qui va à la chasse, operetta in 1 act, with Alfred Delilia, music by Duhem, 1898
 Nostalgie, drama in 1 act, with Trébla, 1900
 Sa Crotte !, comédie-vaudeville in 1 act, with Harry Blount, 1900
 Fleurissez-vous, Mesdames !, with Gavault, 1901
 Le Pont d'Avignon, comédie-vaudeville, with Noël Villiers, 1902
 Le Cartel, comédie-vaudeville in 1 act, 1902
 Chez qui ?, revue-féerie in 1 act and 2 Tableaux, 1902
 Family-Hôtel, vaudeville in 3 acts, with Paul Gavault and Eugène Millou, 1902
 Reims s'expose, revue in 1 acti and 3 Tableaux, 1903
 Veinard !, vaudeville-opérette in 2 acts and 5 tableaux, 1904
 Le Chasseur de canards, comedy in 1 act, 1905
 Don Juan moderne, vaudeville in 1 act, 1905
 Pâquerette, one-act play, with Léon Abric, 1905
 Il est ignoble avec Bouchard !, vaudeville in 1 act, 1906
 Les Suites d'un premier mai, vaudeville in 1 act, with Flers, 1906
 La Veuve, one-act play, with Abric, 1906
 La Revue du centenaire, with Flers, music by Alfred Fock, 1907
 Ah ! Moumoute !, folie-opérette in 2 acts and 6 tableaux, with P.-L. Flers, 1907
 Dans les vieux pots, comedy in 1 act, with Trébla, 1907
 Salu...e !, revue in 2 acts and 8 tableaux, with Flers, 1907
 Les Tribulations d'un gendre, 1908
 A l'Alcazar... de la fourchette, drama extravaganza in 4 tableaux, undated
 L'Arbitre, saynète comique, with Léon Garnier, undated
 Le Coup du gendarme, pantomime, undated
 La Femme sans bras, monologue, with Ernest Gerny, undated
 Paris-Boycotte, revue in 2 acts and 5 tableaux, undated
 La Revue roulante, in 2 acts and 4 tableaux, undated
 Le Circuit du Ceste, opérette revue féerie vaudeville in 2 acts and 17 tableaux, with Flers, undated
 Penses tu !, revue in 2 acts and 8 tableaux, undated

Songs

 Mon p'tit Salé, berceuse argotique, music by Henri Chatau, 1891
 Ah ! c' que j' m'embête !, music by Léopold Gangloff, 1892
 Ballade du ventre, song, music by Henri Albertini, 1892
 Les trois Chemises !, song, music by Gangloff, 1892
 Les Bibis !, music by Gangloff, 1892
 Les Pousse-cailloux !, music by Gangloff, 1893
 Çà vous coûte si peu !, song, music by Gangloff, 1894
 La Cigarière, Spanish song, music by Eugène Dédé fils, 1894
 Libre Échange !, song, music by Fragson, 1894
 Lingaling, chansonnette, music by Eugène Dédé fils, 1894
 La Prière du gueux !, poem by Eugène Héros, incidental music by Léopold Gangloff, 1894
 Nos Parents !, histoire biblique, music by Gangloff, 1895
 La Rosse, song, music arranged by Jules Lasaïgues, after the English song La Didily Idily de C.-M. Rodney, 1895
 Ah ! Viens !, chanson valse, music by Ernest Gillet, 1896
 Contrastes !, song, music by Ernest Lerwile, 1896
 La Michonnette, music by Paul Delmet, 1896
 Pik et Ponk et Poo !, chanson-scie tirée de l'anglais, lyrics by Eugène Héros, music arranged by Gaston Maquis, 1896
 La Queue du diable, pièce fantastique in 2 acts, with Léon Garnier, 1896
 Ce qu'elles coûtent !, chansonnette comiques, music by Félix Chaudoir, 1897
 Revanche !, music by Jean Varney, 1897
 Les Honnêtes Gens !, song, music by Harry Fragson, 1897
 Paris-London !, monologue song, music by Fragson, 1897
 L'Ange, music by Émile Duhem, 1898
 Vision !, mélodie, poem by Eugène Héros, music by André Pradels, 1898
 Voyage de noces, rondeau, music by Émile Bonnamy, 1898
 Toutes les mêmes !, music by Félicien Vargues, 1899
 Les Huit Reflets !, chansonnette, music by Émile Spencer, 1900
 Premier Baiser !, valse chantée sur les motifs de l'Ange qui passe, lyrics by Eugène Héros, music by William Salabert, 1900
 Viv' l'Exposition !, music by William, 1900
 Laissez glaner !, music by Gustave Goublier, 1901
 Inutile Beauté !, poem by Eugène Héros, music by Paul Fauchey, 1902
 Ludo Ratz. Je ne veux pas !, valse chantée, music by Louis Bernard-Saraz, 1902
 Jeu de Massacre !, chansonnette, lyrics by Eugène Héros and Jean Varney, music by Émile Lassailly, 1902
 Tout passe !, valse chantée, lyrics by Paul Gavault and Eugène Héros, music by Rodolphe Berger, 1902
 Avec difficile !, valse chantée, poem by Eugène Héros, music by Paul Fauchey, 1903
 J'ai trois Fleurs dans mon jardin !, poem by Eugène Héros, music by Louis Auguin, 1903
 Le Pisteur !, chansonnette, music by Bertrand Diodet, 1903
 La Bien-aimée !, valse chantée, music by Paul Wachs, 1904
 L'Amour obligatoire, chansonnette, after the American march Anona by Vivian Grey, lyrics by P.-L. Flers et Heros, music arranged by Charles Thony, 1906
 Margotin marche, song on the motives of The British Patrol by G. Ash, lyrics by Héros and André Mauprey, music by Mauprey and Thony, 1906
 Baisers fleuris, valse, poem by Eugène Heros, music by Youssef Khan Nazare-Aga, 1908
 Hop ! eh ! ah ! di ! ohe !, popular song, with Flers, music by Auguste Bosc, 1910
 Bal du Moulin Rouge, undated
 Pourquoi ne pas m'aimer ?, valse chantée sur les motifs de la Valse bleue (sans accords), music by Alfred Margis, undated
 P'tit cochon, music by Fragson, undated
Autres
 Le Brésil à l'Exposition universelle de 1889, with Alfred Marchand, 1889
 Suppression de l'Assistance publique, 1890
 La Grosse Marie, 1896
 Les Lyriques, poems, 1898
 Le Théâtre du Palais Royal de la Montansier à la fin du siècle. Notes et souvenirs, 1901
 Le Théâtre anecdotique, petites histoires de théâtre, foreword by Tristan Bernard and Paul Gavault, 1912
 Les Parodies, undated

Bibliography 
 Revue des lectures, vol.14, 1926, (p. 194) (obituary)
 Russell Parsons Jameson, Rire et sourire, 1926,(p. 19) 
 Serge Dillaz, La Chanson sous la troisième République, 1991 (p. 267)

References 

French chansonniers
19th-century French dramatists and playwrights
20th-century French dramatists and playwrights
French theatre managers and producers
1860 births
Writers from Paris
1925 deaths